Acrobasis pallicornella is a species of snout moth in the genus Acrobasis. It was described by Ragonot in 1887. It is found in Texas.

References

Moths described in 1887
Acrobasis
Moths of North America